General elections were held in the Netherlands on 14 June 1901. The Liberal Union remained the largest party, winning 26 of the 100 seats in the House of Representatives.

Results

References

General elections in the Netherlands
Netherlands
1901 in the Netherlands
Election and referendum articles with incomplete results
1901 elections in the Netherlands
June 1901 events